Calmodulin 3 is a protein that in humans is encoded by the CALM3 gene.

CALM-3 is best known for contracting the heart muscles, and depending on whether this activity is consistent or not, other diseases could emerge as a downside. It is able to maintain or regulate in different types of biological systems, such as cytokinesis or the centrosome cycle.

Calmodulin-3 is able to perform different types of activities and roles, such as binding of calcium and significant activity in regulating an enzyme. The gene CALM-3 is likely to contribute to illnesses that may lead to death, such as Ventricular tachycardia which is associated with the ventricular tachycardia functioning in 2 directions and long QT syndrome which is associated with the QT interval in the electrocardiogram that is significantly longer than normal. In its structure, there are 2 helices that are observed in each of its helix-loop-helix and are then shaped into a perpendicular pattern due to the surface of the protein changing over time. Through transcription, the gene CALM-3 is able to perform the activity of a regulator for its own gene expression and has 6 exons, indicating that each exon has a specific function that takes place in the initiation stage. If there are potentially variants that could impact the calmodulin protein, it could affect the concentration of the Ca mediators that are a part of the protein.

Context 
The CALM-3 gene, along with the protein of calmodulin, has been included in different types of experiments such as DNA isolation that is most common in laboratory animals such as rats. This gene can be detected in animals and humans, mainly through our genomes, and its specific polymorphisms can be found through different types of restriction enzymes. In hospital settings, a process named whole exome sequencing are used and are beneficial in determining whether CALM-3 is a cause of a certain disease. Because the protein calmodulin consists of 3 different genes, it may be difficult to determine exactly how the gene can cause a certain disease to occur and potentially worsen. However, there have been few mutations that were detected in the genes of the calmodulin protein such as in long QT syndrome.

Clinical significance 
There is significant evidence that Calmodulin-3 may be associated with certain diseases, however there are few evidence that this particular gene contributes to diseases that can cause a sudden death as a result. In the lab experiment with rats, lambda rCB1 or hCE1 underwent DNA isolation as both of the genes included the CALM-3 gene, and was compared with 2 different genes that are more common among rats such as genes lambda SC4 and lambda SC8. As a result, although the lambda rCB1 or hCE1 gene may have different structures from the other genes that rats contain in their genomes, its coding strands were fairly similar. As the process of whole exome sequencing was used for patients with long QT syndrome, there was a certain criteria that had to be met in order to fully go through WES such as the patient having a stable or normal medical family history. Based on an electrocardiogram, the rhythms and waves can be detected and if irregular, it could lead to the pathway of long QT syndrome.

References

Further reading

External links 
 
 
 

EF-hand-containing proteins